In numerical analysis, continuous wavelets are functions used by the continuous wavelet transform. These functions are defined as analytical expressions, as functions either of time or of frequency.
Most of the continuous wavelets are used for both wavelet decomposition and composition transforms. That is they are the continuous counterpart of orthogonal wavelets.

The following continuous wavelets have been invented for various applications:

 Poisson wavelet
 Morlet wavelet
 Modified Morlet wavelet
 Mexican hat wavelet
 Complex Mexican hat wavelet
 Shannon wavelet
 Meyer wavelet
 Difference of Gaussians
 Hermitian wavelet
 Beta wavelet
 Causal wavelet
 μ wavelets
 Cauchy wavelet
 Addison wavelet

See also
Wavelet

 
Numerical analysis